The Saginaw Formation is a geologic formation in Michigan. It preserves fossils dating back to the Pennsylvanian period.

References
 

Carboniferous Michigan
Pennsylvanian Series